= Copyright in Bermuda =

Copyright in Bermuda applies automatically and it is not necessary to register a work to benefit from copyright protection.

Type of Work	Length of protection
Written, dramatic, musical and artistic	70 years after the author's death
Sound and music recording	70 years from first publication
Films	70 years after the death of the director, author of screenplay, author of dialogue and composer
Broadcasts	50 years from first broadcast
Layout of published editions of written, dramatic or musical works	25 years from first publication
